Below is a list of squads used in the 1966 Arab Cup.

Group A

Bahrain
Coach: Jassim Al-Moawdah

Iraq
Coach: Adil Basher

Jordan
Coach: Shehadeh Mousa

Kuwait
Coach:  Saleh El Wahsh

Lebanon
Coach: Joseph Nalbandian

Group B

Libya
Coach:

North Yemen
Coach:

Palestine
Coach:

Syria
Coach:  Cornel Drăgușin

References

External links
Details - rsssf.com

Squad
1966